The 2015–2016 Israeli Basketball Super League was the 62nd season of the Israeli Basketball Super League. The regular season started on October 11, 2015 and ended on March 6, 2016. The last game was played on June 9, 2016.

This season, the league had a different format. After the eight best teams qualified for the Playoffs, the winners of the series would play in a Final Four tournament.

Hapoel Jerusalem was the defending champion. Hapoel failed to reclaim its title, because Maccabi Rishon LeZion won in the Final. It was the first championship ever for Rishon LeZion.

Teams

Maccabi Kiryat Gat has been promoted to the league after winning 2014–15 National League. Hapoel Gilboa Galil, who finished last season, relegated from the Super League.

Stadia and locations

Regular season

Playoffs

Quarterfinals
The Quarterfinals were played as best-of-five playoff series. The higher ranked team hosted games 1, 3 and 5 (if necessary). The lower ranked team hosted games 2 and 4 (if necessary). The Quarterfinals started on May 19 and ended on June 1.

|}

Final four

Final standings

Statistical leaders
As of 22 April 2016.

|  style="width:50%; vertical-align:top;"|

Points

|}
|}

|  style="width:50%; vertical-align:top;"|

Assists

|}
|}

Season highs

Source: RealGM

All-Star Game
The 2016 Israeli League All-star event was held on 25 March 2016, at the Begin Arena in Eilat.

Three-point shootout

Slam Dunk Contest

Awards

Regular season MVP
 Darryl Monroe (Maccabi Rishon LeZion)

All-BSL 1st team
 Gal Mekel (Maccabi Tel Aviv)
 Khalif Wyatt (Hapoel Eilat)
 Donta Smith (Hapoel Jerusalem)
 Lior Eliyahu (Hapoel Jerusalem)
 Darryl Monroe (Maccabi Rishon LeZion)

All-BSL 2nd team
 Gregory Vargas (Maccabi Haifa)
 Raviv Limonad (Hapoel Tel Aviv)
 Shawn Dawson (Maccabi Rishon LeZion)
 Will Clyburn (Hapoel Holon)
 Richard Howell (Ironi Nahariya)

Coach of the Season
 Arik Shivek (Maccabi Rishon LeZion)

Rising Star
 Karam Mashour (Bnei Herzliya)

Best Defender
 Gregory Vargas (Maccabi Haifa)

Most Improved Player
 Itay Segev (Maccabi Tel Aviv)

Sixth Man of the Season
 Bar Timor (Hapoel Jerusalem)

External links
BSL's official website

References

Israeli Basketball Premier League seasons
Israeli
Basketball